Graham Peacock (borh July 26, 1945 in London, United Kingdom) is an English-born abstract Canadian painter. He was a member of the art group founded by Dr. Kenworth Moffett (1934-2016) known as the New New Painters.

From 1969, Peacock was a Professor of Fine Art at and then also the Coordinator of the Painting program at the Department of Art and Design, University of Alberta, in Edmonton, Alberta, Canada. He has been a retired professor emeritus of the university since 2008. In 1995 Peacock was given a solo museum exhibition at the Art Gallery of Greater Victoria in Victoria, British Columbia. In 2005 Peacock's work was the subject of a retrospective at the Art Gallery of Alberta and an accompanying catalogue was published.

References

1945 births
Living people
Artists from London
Canadian male painters
Canadian people of British descent
20th-century Canadian painters
20th-century Canadian male artists